The Ulster Grand Prix is a motorcycle road race that takes place on the  Dundrod Circuit made up entirely of closed-off public roads near Belfast, Northern Ireland, United Kingdom. According to the race organisers, it is the fastest road race in the world.

The first races took place in 1922 and in 1935 and 1948 the Fédération Internationale de Motocyclisme gave it the title Grand Prix d'Europe. The Ulster Grand Prix was included as one of the races in the inaugural 1949 Grand Prix motorcycle racing season (now MotoGP), a place it held until 1971. It also counted for the Formula TT Championship between 1979 and 1990.

Since the Covid pandemic meeting cancellation in 2020 the future of the meeting is in doubt.

History

 The race has been held on three different circuits. The  Old Clady circuit was used from 1922 until 1939 and included a notoriously bumpy  straight.

After World War II the new Clady circuit was used that, due to road improvements, was now  in length and in use between 1947 and 1952.

In 1953 the race was moved to the  Dundrod Circuit where it is still held. The 1971 event was won by Australian Jack Findlay in what was the Ulster Grand Prix's last year as part of the FIM Grand Prix international motorcycle racing calendar. Findlay's victory on a Suzuki was also notable for marking the first 500cc class win for a motorcycle powered by a two stroke engine. The event was cancelled in 1972 because of the political situation in Northern Ireland, but it was held in 2001 during the Foot-and-mouth crisis, even though the North West 200 and Isle of Man TT were cancelled that year.

In 1997 Dublin sidecar pilot Stephen Galligan died of injuries sustained in a warm-up crash the day before the race. Mr Galligan died ten days later in hospital. Seven-year-old spectator Christopher McConnell-Hewitt also lost his life when he was struck by the sidecar which veered out of control on a long straight and crashed into a crowd. 

Future in doubt
As of 2023 the future of the meeting is under threat. The last running of the event was in 2019 with the following meetings being cancelled as a consequence of a lack of financial backing in addition to the Covid-19 Pandemic.

In 2020 a winding up order was issued to the Ulster Grand Prix organisers, the Dundrod & District Motorcycle Club, with the Dundrod & District having amassed debts of approximately £300,000. Following the issuing of the order the club went into liquidation. 

In March 2022 a potential new promotor, the Revival Racing Motorcycle Club, had signalled that they were prepared to undertake the stewardship of the meeting with a view to a return of racing in August 2022. However once again the required funding could not be secured and this resulted in the proposal being withdrawn and the 2022 race meeting was cancelled.

During the Autumn of 2022 a further feasibility study was undertaken by Revival Racing with a view to the running of the Ulster Grand Prix in August 2023. Whilst initial studies appeared favourable, Revival Racing subsequently found difficulty in mustering the required financing and in October 2022 issued the following starement:

An important announcement was made on February 9 2023 by the Motorcycle Union of Ireland with regard to the running of motorcycle racing in Ireland for the 2023 season. This followed a significant increase in the insurance premium required to cover the events and consequently placed the 2023 racing schedule under threat of being cancelled.

Official names and sponsors
1958, 1961, 1964–1965, 1971: Ulster Grand Prix (no official sponsor)

Famous riders

Joey Dunlop won 24 Ulster Grand Prix races during his career, with Phillip McCallen winning 14 races, Peter Hickman with 13 wins, Bruce Anstey 12 and Brian Reid 9 wins. Some of the famous riders include: Guy Martin (11 wins) Stanley Woods (7 wins), Jimmie Guthrie, Jimmie Simpson, Artie Bell, Les Graham, Freddie Frith (3 wins), Geoff Duke (3 wins), John Surtees (6 wins), Ray Amm, Carlo Ubbiali (5 wins), Bill Lomas (3 wins), Mike Hailwood (7 wins), Giacomo Agostini (7 wins), Phil Read (3 wins), Bill Ivy (3 wins), Bob McIntyre, Gary Hocking (3 wins), Tom Herron (5 wins), Ron Haslam (5 wins), Jon Ekerold, and more recently Mick Grant, Wayne Gardner, Steve Hislop, Robert Dunlop (9 wins).

FIM World Championship rounds (1949–1971)

Multiple winners (riders)

Multiple winners (manufacturers)

By year
A pink background indicates a round that was not part of the Grand Prix motorcycle racing championship.

Footnotes

See also
 Clady Circuit
 Dundrod Circuit
 North West 200
 Grand Prix motorcycle racing
 List of Grand Prix motorcycle racing seasons
 List of Grand Prix motorcycle racing World Champions

References

External links
 Ulster Grand Prix official website
 Ulster Grand Prix race history 
 Ulster Grand Prix Supporters Club

 
1922 establishments in Northern Ireland
Recurring sporting events established in 1922
Motorcycle Grands Prix
Motorcycle racing in the United Kingdom
Motorsport competitions in the United Kingdom
Motorsport in Northern Ireland
Motorcycle races
Sport in County Antrim